Adey is a surname of English origin. At the time of the British Census of 1881, its relative frequency was highest in Berkshire (10.1 times the British average), followed by Staffordshire, Wiltshire, Cardiganshire, Hampshire, Warwickshire, the Channel Islands, Dorset, County Durham and Gloucestershire. Notable people with the surname include:

 Garry Adey (born 1945), English rugby union footballer
 Paul Adey (born 1963), Canadian ice hockey player and coach
 Rosemary Adey (1933–2013), Australian softball player
 Steve Adey, English musician
 William James Adey CMG (1874–1956) South Australian educationist

See also 
 Adey-Jones

References